Cyperus boreohemisphaericus is a species of sedge that is endemic to an area in Ethiopia.

The species was first formally described by the botanist Kåre Arnstein Lye in 1993.

See also
 List of Cyperus species

References

boreohemisphaericus
Flora of Ethiopia
Plants described in 1993
Taxa named by Kåre Arnstein Lye